Lyonsiidae is a family of small saltwater clams, marine bivalve molluscs in the order Anomalodesmata.

Description
Members of this family have inequivalve, oblong valves that are nearly equilateral. The right valve is more convex than the left, and there are usually no teeth. The ligament connecting the two valves is in an internal groove, and the hinge has a free ossicle.

Genera and species
The World Register of Marine Species lists the following genera and species in the family:

Allogramma  Dall, 1903
Allogramma elegans  (Thiele & Jaeckel, 1931)
Allogramma formosa  (Jeffreys, 1882)
Allogramma oahuense  (Dall, 1913)
Bentholyonsia  Habe, 1952 
Bentholyonsia teramachii  (Habe, 1952)
Entodesma Phillips, 1845
Entodesma beana (d'Orbigny, 1853)
Entodesma brasiliense  (Gould, 1850)
Entodesma brevifrons  (G.B. Sowerby I, 1834)
Entodesma cuneata  (Gray, 1828)
Entodesma delicatum  (Marincovich, 1973)
Entodesma elongatulum  Soot-Ryen, 1957
Entodesma fretalis  (Dall, 1915)
Entodesma lucasana  (Bartsch & Rehder, 1939)
Entodesma navicula (A. Adams and Reeve, 1850)
Entodesma patagonicum  (d'Orbigny, 1846)
Entodesma pictum (G. B. Sowerby I, 1834)
Entodesma saxicola (Baird, 1863)
Entodesma sechuranum  Pilsbry & Olsson, 1935
Entodesma solemyalis  (Lamarck, 1818)
Entodesma weisbordi  Macsotay & Campos, 2001
Lyonsia Turton, 1822
Lyonsia adriatica
Lyonsia alvarezii  d'Orbigny, 1846
Lyonsia arcaeforme  Martens, 1885
Lyonsia arenosa (Moller, 1842)
Lyonsia argentea Jeffreys, 1881
Lyonsia bracteata (Gould, 1850)
Lyonsia californica Conrad, 1837
Lyonsia cucumerina  Ivanova in Scarlato, 1981
Lyonsia floridana Conrad, 1849
Lyonsia granulifera A. E. Verrill and Bush, 1898
Lyonsia hyalina Conrad, 1831
Lyonsia kawamurai  Habe, 1952
Lyonsia malvinensis  d'Orbigny, 1846
Lyonsia norvegica (J.F. Gmelin, 1791)
Lyonsia nuculaniformis  Scarlato, 1981
Lyonsia panamensis  Dall, 1908
Lyonsia praetenuis  Dunker, 1882
Lyonsia shimkevitch  (M. Sars, 1868)
Lyonsia striata (Montagu, 1815) 
Lyonsia taiwanica  Lan & Okutani, 2002
Lyonsia ventricosa  Gould, 1861
Lyonsia vniroi  Scarlato, 1981

References

 
Bivalve families